Christelle Joseph-Mathieu (born 16 August 1975) is a French handball player. She competed as a right back in the women's tournament at the 2000 Summer Olympics.

Her sister  is a goalkeeper.

References

External links
 

1975 births
Living people
French female handball players
Olympic handball players of France
Handball players at the 2000 Summer Olympics
Handball players from Paris